The FIL World Luge Natural Track Championships 1994 took place in Gsies, Italy. This was the second time the city had hosted the event having done so in 1990.

Men's singles

Women's singles

Men's doubles

Medal table

References
Men's doubles natural track World Champions
Men's singles natural track World Champions
Women's singles natural track World Champions

FIL World Luge Natural Track Championships
1994 in luge
1996 in Italian sport
Luge in Italy